Piotrowo  is a village in the administrative district of Gmina Brodnica, within Śrem County, Greater Poland Voivodeship, in west-central Poland.

History
Piotrowo was first mentioned in documents in 1396. At that time, Piotrowo was owned by Przybysław Piotrowski and Grzymka Piotrowska. From 1975 to 1998, Piotrowo administratively belonged to Poznań Voivodeship.

References

Villages in Śrem County